The ÖBB Class 1044 is a class of universal electric locomotives operated by ÖBB. The class is capable of hauling either heavy passenger traffic or goods trains on both lowland and mountainous routes.

At the time of its entry into service, the Class 1044 was the most powerful class of four-axle locomotives in the world. Until the introduction of the Class 1016 locomotives, it was the showpiece class of the ÖBB. All members of the class, except its two prototypes, have now been converted into Class 1144 locomotives.

History
After the success of the earlier Class 1042, and the success of the ASEA-made Class 1043 the Austrian Railways decided to acquire locally-made thyristor locomotives. The first two prototypes were made in 1976, both featuring different bridging structures: 1044.01 featured an 8-bridge structure and 1044.02 featured a 4-bridge structure. Series production started in 1977 with 1044.03, that used the bridging structure from the second prototype.

Despite being the most modern locomotive of the ÖBB, it wasn't the most reliable. In 1978 wheel cracks occurred, leading to modifications in the wheel design. In the winters from 1979 to 1981, a severe design flaw was noticed, where the air intakes would suck snow particles into the locomotive, damaging its internals. From locomotive 1044.74 onwards, a new intake design was introduced across all new locomotives with the older locomotives being rebuilt using such design. However this performance was mocked by many drivers and railfans, which lead to the locomotive being nicknamed up to this day as a "Alpine vacuum cleaner".

By 1987, 126 of such locomotives were delivered. This was the 1044.0 subseries. Starting from 1989, a second subseries was introduced, the 1044.2 subseries which featured modified bogies, improved sound insulation and different gear ratios. A total of 91 units were made.

Out of the two prototypes, only 1044.01 survives today. In 1987, it was converted into a high speed test locomotive, being renumbered into 1044.501. During testing, it achieved a maximum speed of 241.25 km/h. After testing its maximum operational speed was reduced to 220 km/h, but in 1996 it suffered drivegear damage, leading to its reconstruction as a normal locomotive and was finally retired in 2002. These days it still exists, however it is in a bad preservation state. 1044.02 was stripped and used as a spare parts locomotive.

Between 2002 and 2005, the 1044.2 subseries became the 1144.2 subseries, being retrofitted for usage on push–pull trains. The 1044.0 subseries was also converted to the 1144 series between 2009 and 2013, being fitted with new GSM-R cab radios, modernized PZB 90 and SIFA safety systems and new LED headlights. The problems with the previous push–pull control were also fixed, and this refurbishment showed the success of this program that was applied to the older 1042 series that were converted to the 1142 series.

The locomotives can be seen on most Austrian mainlines and southern parts of the German railway network. Some locomotives, however, are hired to RCC Germany, a private railway operator, and use them up to Bremerhaven. Before the introduction of the Taurus, these locomotives were used for hauling express trains to Munich.

Starting with 2018, the oldest locomotives (manufactured around 1977-1978) have reached their peak kilometrical usage, where they would be retired and used as spares locomotives, however this has yet to have happened to these locomotives, as only one has been withdrawn, expecting scrapping or a life-extending refurbishment.

All the locomotives are now painted in the ÖBB red-silver livery, apart from 1144.40 which is painted in the typical ÖBB design used from the 1970s until the 1990s, in the Jaffa orange livery with a white stripe, and the old "Pflatsch" logo. 1144.092 and 1144.117 feature a so-called "Schachbrett" introduced in the late 1980s, with a cream and red livery. 1144.092 features the current ÖBB logo, whilst 1144.117 has the "Pflatsch" logo.

Accidents
On 13 February 1993, a 1044 241 locomotive was involved in a collision at Melk railway station, severely damaging the locomotive.

On 11 August 1995, an intercity from Vienna to Lindau hauled by 1044 047 and with an unknown 1042 locomotive as a bank engine derailed at Braz on the Arlbergbahn when a bridge was washed away by storms. The 1044 locomotive and two passenger cars fell into a small stream and were damaged. Three people were killed after the accident and another 100 were severely injured. The locomotive was so badly damaged in the accident that it was scrapped in the same year.

On 12 December 1995, 1044 235 unit was involved in a head-on collision with a DRG Class ET 91 train, commonly known as the "Glass Train" at Garmisch-Partenkirchen. The accident destroyed the trainset, and despite reconstruction efforts it was rendered unusable due to a heavily damaged bogie (it was the only train of the class that had survived, as the other one was bombed during American air raids during WW2).

Another unknown 1044 locomotive was involved in an accident at Vienna-Kledering on 17 November 2001, in which a SPAD was committed by the locomotive. Despite quick braking, the locomotive struck an S-Bahn train that was being diverted onto another track and injured 6 people.

On 10 February 2014, two Siemens ES64F4 locomotives of Lokomotion and Rail Traction Company were uncoupled from a Ro-La train that ran away from the Ro-La terminal at Brennero. The train was derailed after it hit a dead end stub track where 1144 281 fell off the embankment, scraping a building in this process. No major damage occurred.

On 1 December 2015, 1144 282 was involved in an accident at Semmering where the locomotive slammed into a heavy freight train that got stuck on the climbing section of the Semmering Railway. The train had stopped there, awaiting for a banking engine to come and help it but accidentally rolled backwards, unknown to the drivers of the 1144. Fourteen container cars derailed, two of them in the tunnel, and the cab of the locomotive was severely damaged, with the train driver being injured.

Gallery

See also 

 History of rail transport in Austria
 Rail transport in Austria

References

 This article is based upon a translation of the German language version as of July 2018.

Austrian Federal Railways electric locomotives
Brown, Boveri & Cie locomotives
Bo′Bo′ locomotives
Siemens locomotives
15 kV AC locomotives
Railway locomotives introduced in 1976
Standard gauge locomotives of Austria